Rock Mafia is an American record production team, consisting of Tim James and Antonina Armato who have been active since the early 2000s. They have written and produced 38 top ten singles, and have sold over 50 million records worldwide. They have worked with artists such as Eminem, Marshmello, Quavo, Diplo, Illenium, Zedd, Gwen Stefani, Young Thug, Tiesto, No Doubt, Wyclef Jean, Green Day, Mariah Carey, Justin Bieber, Hoku, Flo Rida, Ellie Goulding, Aura Dione, Tokio Hotel, Bebe Rexha and Armin van Buuren. In the 2000s, they worked extensively with Disney stars signed to Hollywood Records, mainly Miley Cyrus, Vanessa Hudgens, Demi Lovato, and Selena Gomez.

Aside from their production work, the duo have released one mixtape and a string of singles, most notably "The Big Bang" and "Morning Sun" featuring Miley Cyrus.

Career
In 2008, Rock Mafia's remix of Miley Cyrus' "See You Again" was released as a single. late 2010, Rock Mafia released a song featuring James' own vocals entitled "The Big Bang". The song was used as the theme song for the VH1 reality show Mob Wives. "The Big Bang" music video featured Miley Cyrus and Kevin Zegers and currently has more than 41.2 million views on YouTube. Rock Mafia were reportedly in talks with potential writers and producers to bring the music video for "The Big Bang" to the big screens as a feature film, with Armato revealing on her Twitter that she had been meeting with Tish Cyrus (Miley Cyrus' mother) and Jennifer Todd (producer of Alice in Wonderland and Memento) to work on creating the movie."The Big Bang" is featured on the video game FIFA 12, which launched in September 2011, and their song "Fly or Die" is part of the soundtrack in FIFA 13. Their song "I Am" featuring Wyclef Jean, Bill Kaulitz and David Correy featured as soundtrack on EA Sports game, FIFA 14.

Rock Mafia scored a hit in Europe with Aura Dione's hit single "Friends," a song written and produced together with David Jost. A clip showing Miley Cyrus recording vocals over the "Pimps and Hos" track, which has now been renamed  "Morning Sun" and has been posted online.

Discography

Mixtapes

Singles

As lead artist

As featured artist

References

External links
 Official Website of Rock Mafia Official Website

American dance music groups
American pop music groups
American male songwriters
Record production duos
American songwriting teams